John Tom Jones (December 6, 1923 – July 14, 2014) was an American football player, coach, and college athletics administrator.  He served as the head football coach at Troy State University—now known as Troy University—from 1972 to 1973, compiling a record of 11–7–2.  He was also the athletic director at Troy State from 1972 to 1974.  Jones was hired at Troy State after coaching the freshman football team at Auburn University for six seasons.

Jones was a native of Tallassee, Alabama.  He played high school football for coach J.E. "Hot" O'Brien and was part of the Tallassee Tigers' legendary 57-game unbeaten streak (56 wins, 1 tie).

He died at his home in Lowndesboro, Alabama on July 14, 2014, at the age of 90.

Head coaching record

College

References

External links
 

1923 births
2014 deaths
Auburn Tigers football coaches
Troy Trojans athletic directors
Troy Trojans baseball players
Troy Trojans football coaches
Troy Trojans football players
Auburn University alumni
Players of American football from Tallahassee, Florida